Sister Clare Maria of the Trinity and the Heart of Mary (born Clare Theresa Crockett; 14 November 1982 – 16 April 2016) was a Catholic nun and former actress from Northern Ireland.

Early life 
Clare Crockett was born in Derry in Northern Ireland. As a young child she loved singing, writing stories and reciting poetry. In secondary school she was most passionate about literature and theater. She was a very lively student and played the class clown at times. She joined an acting agency at 14 and got her first job at 15. She worked as a theater actor, writer and director, and as a TV presenter for Channel 4. She was a self-confessed wild child during her teenage years and loved to go partying. She wanted to become an actress after landing a small role in the Jimmy McGovern film Sunday, about Bloody Sunday in 1972 in Crockett's native Derry.

Conversion 
After a religious experience in Spain on Good Friday 2000 she felt called to religious life. She felt confirmation of her call in the months afterwards, including from a priest at World Youth Day 2000 who told her surprising details of her childhood. During her final school year she felt torn between her worldly life and her call to vocation, and her worldly life seemed to be winning out. However, further religious experiences and the continued feeling of having a call helped convince her. In summer 2001 she went back to the convent of the Servant Sisters of the Home of the Mother in Spain, where she took the name Sister Clare Maria of the Trinity and the Heart of Mary.

Life as a religious sister 
She worked in Spain, the United States and Ecuador, doing pastoral care duties, hospital chaplaincy, teaching and missionary outreach. She was well-known for her great interpersonal skills and was much loved by her colleagues and pupils. As part of her work, she voiced the character of Lucy in the children's series "Hi Lucy" that aired on EWTN for many years.

Death 

On 16 April 2016, while she was playing the guitar and singing with her companions, the house where she was staying collapsed due to the 2016 Ecuador earthquake.  Hours later she was found lifeless under the rubble.  She died due to multiple injuries in Playa Prieta, a community of Riochico, Portoviejo, Ecuador.

Her remains were flown from Ecuador two weeks after her death back to her home town of Derry and were laid to rest in the new area of the City Cemetery on Lone Moor Road.

Since her death, the story of her life has become known to many and she has been an inspiration for her womanhood and for her exceptional commitment to her vocation.

Legacy 

The movie All Or Nothing summarizes her life. In 2020, a house-sized mural commemorating Sister Clare was unveiled near her home in Derry, and a sister in her religious order published a biography of her.

Miracles
Healings and fertility miracles have been attributed to her after people prayed for her intercession and there have been calls for her to be declared a saint.
Usually a beatification process doesn’t begin until at least 5 years after a person’s death. In January 2021 her order said that they have begun "to take steps in view of opening the cause" of her beatification, but that it also depends on the local ecclesial authorities in Ecuador, as set out in the Catholic Church's relevant document, Sanctorum Mater.

References

External links
 Homepage of Sister Clare maintained by her order
 Biography of Sister Clare by Sister Kristen Gardner, SHM (2020)
 All or Nothing movie on youtube

1982 births
2016 deaths
21st-century Irish nuns
21st-century venerated Christians
Deaths in earthquakes
Actors from Derry (city)